is a Japanese voice actor and actor from Saitama Prefecture who is affiliated with the Himawari Theatre Group. He is known for his roles as Arato Endo in Beatless and Tsukushi Tsukamoto in Days.

Filmography

Anime
2015
Tokyo Ghoul √A, Kōtarō Amon (young, episode 4)

2016
Macross Delta, Goora (episode 6)
Days, Tsukushi Tsukamoto
Puzzle & Dragons X, Ace
 
2018
Beatless, Arato Endo
Hinomaru Sumo, Shun Kariya
Ace Attorney Season 2, Rick Steam (episodes 10–12)

2019
Welcome to Demon School! Iruma-kun, Picero Agares

2021
Yu-Gi-Oh! Sevens, Braun Honya
I'm Standing on a Million Lives, Friend (episodes 6–7)
Restaurant in Another World season 2, Jack (episode 3)
Sakugan, Royby (episode 6)

2022
Pokémon Ultimate Journeys: The Series, Hop
I'm the Villainess, So I'm Taming the Final Boss, Denis
Boruto: Naruto Next Generations, Eiki Fūma

Dubbing
Frankenweenie (Victor Frankenstein)

References

External links
Agency profile 

1999 births
Living people
Male voice actors from Saitama Prefecture